Tinda is a genus of flies in the family Stratiomyidae.

Species
Tinda acanthinoidea (Jaennicke, 1867)
Tinda cormasa (Walker, 1849)
Tinda indica (Walker, 1851)
Tinda javana (Macquart, 1838)
Tinda maxima Kertész, 1914
Tinda nigra (Macquart, 1835)
Tinda vitalisi Brunetti, 1924

References

Stratiomyidae
Brachycera genera
Taxa named by Francis Walker (entomologist)
Diptera of Africa
Diptera of Asia